Sungguminasa is a town and Gowa Regency's administrative capital in South Sulawesi Province, Indonesia. It is home to the Balla' Lompoa Museum, a reconstruction of the Gowa royal palace. The building is constructed on stilts and made of ironwood.

Climate
Sungguminasa has a tropical monsoon climate (Am) with moderate to little rainfall from May to October and heavy to very heavy rainfall from November to April.

References

Populated places in South Sulawesi